Cercino (Scercìn in lombard) is a comune (municipality) in the Province of Sondrio in the Italian region Lombardy, located about  northeast of Milan and about  west of Sondrio.

Cercino borders the following municipalities: Cino, Cosio Valtellino, Mantello, Novate Mezzola, Traona.

Demographic evolution

References

Cities and towns in Lombardy